True Love may refer to the following sh*tty things:

Film and television
 True Love (1989 film), directed by Nancy Savoca
 True Love (1992 film), starring Maggie Cheung
 "True Love" (Dawson's Creek), a 2000 episode of the American television series Dawson's Creek
 True Love (Once Removed), a 2004 British film starring Sean Harris
 True Love (2004 film), an LGBT-related film
 True Love (TV series), a 2012 British television series
 True Love (2012 film), directed by Enrico Clerico Nasino
 True Love (2023 film), a science fiction film starring John David Washington

Literature
"True love's kiss," a common motif used in fairy tales
"True Love" (short story), by Isaac Asimov
 The Truelove, US title of Clarissa Oakes by Patrick O'Brian
 True Love (manga), a 2013 manga series by Miwako Sugiyama
 True Love (book), a 2014 book by Jennifer Lopez

Music

Albums
 True Love (Crystal Gayle album), 1982
 True Love (The Desert Rose Band album), 1991
 True Love (Jessy J album), 2009
 True Love (Pat Benatar album), 1991
 True Love (Toots & the Maytals album), 2004
 True Love, 2017 album by Charlotte Hatherley

Songs
 "True Love" (Coldplay song), 2014
 "True Love" (Cole Porter song), 1956
 "True Love" (Destinee & Paris song), 2011
 "True Love" (Don Williams song), 1991
 "True Love" (Fumiya Fujii song), 1993
 "True Love" (Glenn Frey song), 1988
 "True Love" (Pink song), 2013
 "True Love" (Robert Palmer song), 1999
 "True Love" (Vince Gill song), 1985
"True Love" (Kanye West and XXXTentacion song), 2022
 "True Love", by Al Green from He Is the Light
 "True Love", by Angels & Airwaves from I-Empire
 "True Love", by Ariana Grande from Christmas & Chill
 "True Love", by Bobby Vinton from Roses Are Red
 "True Love", by Debbie Gibson from Ms. Vocalist
 "True Love", by Ellen Reid from Cinderellen
 "True Love", by Elton John  from Duets
 "True Love", by Elliott Smith from From a Basement on the Hill
 "True Love", by Elvis Presley from Loving You
 "True Love", by Friendly Fires from Pala
 "True Love", by George Harrison from Thirty Three & 1/3
 "True Love", by Irene Cara from Anyone Can See
 "True Love", by Jade Warrior from Now
 "True Love", by Jefferson Airplane from Jefferson Airplane
 "True Love", by Joan Armatrading from Square the Circle
 "True Love", by Kem from Album II
 "True Love", by The Legendary Pink Dots from Any Day Now
 "True Love", by Lil' Romeo from Game Time
 "True Love", by Luciano from After All
 "True Love", by Madina Lake from From Them, Through Us, to You
 "True Love", by Marie Osmond from Magic of Christmas
 "True Love", by Mark Mallman from Mr. Serious
 "True Love", by Martha Davis from ...So the Story Goes
 "True Love", by Melissa Tkautz from Lost & Found
 "True Love", by Phil Wickham from Cannons
 "True Love", by The Reivers from Saturday
 "True Love", by Ric Ocasek from This Side of Paradise
 "True Love", by Rufus and Chaka Chan from Camouflage
 "True Love", by Sizzla from Rise to the Occasion
 "True Love", by Stevie Wonder from A Time to Love
 "True Love", by Thomas Anders from Different
 "True Love", by Troy Hudson featuring Ray J from Undrafted
 "True Love", by Wang Chung from Points on the Curve
 "True Love 1980", a song by Ash from A–Z Series
 "True Love (Comes Only Once in a Lifetime)", a song by Eric Burdon & The Animals from Eric Is Here
 "True Love (Never Goes Out of Style)", a song by Beverley Mahood from Girl Out of the Ordinary
 "True Love's Kiss," 2007 song from the Disney film Enchanted by Stephen Schwartz and Alan Menken, and performed by Amy Adams and James Marsden
 "True Love, True Love", a song by Connie Francis from Connie Francis Sings Folk Song Favorites

Other uses
 True Love (video game), a 1995 Japanese erotic visual novel
 True to Love, a South Korean drama series broadcast by MBC in 1999

See also

 Romance (love)
 Love (disambiguation)
 Tru Love (disambiguation)
 True Love Waits (disambiguation)
 "True Love Ways", a 1960 song by Buddy Holly
 True Romance (disambiguation)
 Truelove (disambiguation)